This is a listing of the horses that finished in either first, second, or third place and the number of starters in the Belmont Stakes, the third leg of the United States Triple Crown of Thoroughbred Racing run at  on dirt for three-year-olds at Belmont Park in Elmont, New York.

A  † designates a Triple Crown Winner.
A  ‡ designates a Filly.
Note:  D. Wayne Lukas swept the 1995 Triple Crown with two different horses.

References 

Belmont Stakes
Lists of horse racing results